The 183rd Pennsylvania House of Representatives District is located in Southeast Pennsylvania and has been represented since 2017 by Zach Mako.

District profile
The 183rd Pennsylvania House of Representatives District is located in Lehigh County and Northampton County and encompasses Mary Immaculate Missionary College and Indian Creek. It also includes the following areas:

 Lehigh County
 Slatington
 Lowhill Township
 North Whitehall Township
 Northampton County
 Bath
 North Catasauqua
 Northampton
 Walnutport
 Allen Township
 East Allen Township
 Lehigh Township
 Moore Township (PART, Districts Beersville and Klecknersville)

Representatives

Recent election results

References

External links
District map from the United States Census Bureau
Pennsylvania House Legislative District Maps from the Pennsylvania Redistricting Commission.  
Population Data for District 183 from the Pennsylvania Redistricting Commission.

Government of Lehigh County, Pennsylvania
Government of Northampton County, Pennsylvania
183